Germán Osvaldo Cortez Sandoval (20 April 1954 – 9 June 2010) is a Mexican politician from the Institutional Revolutionary Party. He served as Deputy of the LXI Legislature of the Mexican Congress representing the State of Mexico.

Cortez died on 9 June 2010 due to a heart attack.

References

1954 births
2010 deaths
Politicians from the State of Mexico
Institutional Revolutionary Party politicians
21st-century Mexican politicians
Deputies of the LXI Legislature of Mexico
Members of the Chamber of Deputies (Mexico) for the State of Mexico